The Flume was a Log Flume at Alton Towers in Staffordshire. It opened in 1981 and was rethemed in 2004 coinciding with its sponsorship by Imperial Leather. The ride was a bath time themed log flume with three drops. It was the longest log flume attraction in the world at the time of opening. The attraction closed in 2015 and was replaced by the Wicker Man rollercoaster.

Ride Experience
The ride was approximately six minutes long and began with the loading of passengers into the boats, which had a maximum capacity of five. The boarding took place in a moving, circular station. Once the boat dispatched from the station, it took several turns through woodland and then travelled up to the first lift hill. The boat was then dropped down a small drop to gain some height, turning around the woodland until it came to the second lift hill, which was enclosed in a darkened hut, followed by a 'blind' drop. Following the Imperial Leather sponsorship, a shower sprinkler and riders were met with a giant rubber duck statue. The ride then traveled through more woodland before embarking up a 86ft lift hill, then swiftly dropping riders 85ft where riders were usually soaked with water. The boats then travelled through two shower sprinklers before returning to the station.

History
In 1980, Alton Towers opened the ride Corkscrew along with a few other amusement attractions. Alton Towers gained popularity so for the 1981 season they decided to open a log flume. Construction started in late 1980 to open the ride for the 1981 season. the park's first major scale engineering project including purpose built reservoir sunk into a former field. The 5.5-acre site was bordered on two sides by the Park Railway. initially access to the new ride was via a railway bridge over the tracks, by 1982 the Railway had been shortened to allow easier access for the popular new ride. 

In 1981, the 'White Water Flume' opened to the public as the world's longest log flume with its  waterway themed around the Canadian Falls; by 1983 the ride had acquired its traditional and more popular name of 'The Log Flume' and for the next 23 years operated as such. Between 1984 and 1995 it also featured props from 'Dinosaur Land' which had been closed the previous season to make way for The Black Hole, including a prehistoric family inside the tunnel section of the flume.
In 2004, the ride was re-themed to 'The Flume' with a bath theme, as sponsored by the soap manufacturer, Imperial Leather; new 'bath' boats replacing the logs, new lining, maintenance, a refurbished station, a yellow duck, shower and other bath-time theming. In 2008, the area in which the ride operated was re-themed to Mutiny Bay, however the ride retained its bath time theme.

Weeks before the beginning of the 2016 season, Alton Towers announced that the ride was to be closed permanently. On March 16, 2016, the park posted a photo through their Towers Loving Care Twitter page of a sign on the perimeter of the former area of the attraction that reads "SW8. Ground breaking new ride development", marking the construction site for the resort's next large investment SW8.

After the ride's closure and during the construction of Wicker Man, the resort held charity auctions with lots containing a variety of items from The Flume. This included various queue line and warning signage, as well as the ride boats.

Media gallery

References

External links 
 old.towerstimes.co.uk attractions at the Towers Times website
 Clips of old Log Flume ride
 Youtube clip of the Log Flume (retheme as bath tubs)

Alton Towers
Water rides manufactured by Mack Rides
Amusement rides introduced in 1981
Amusement rides that closed in 2015
Buildings and structures demolished in 2016
Demolished buildings and structures in England